Glenn H. Schiffman is an American businessman, philanthropist, and Chief Financial Officer of Fanatics. Schiffman was appointed to the position at Fanatics in August 2021 after serving as Chief Financial Officer of IAC.  Prior to IAC, he served as Senior Managing Director at Guggenheim Securities.

Career
Schiffman graduated from Duke University with a B.A. in Economics and History.  He began his career at Lehman Brothers in 1991, where he spent 18 years in a variety of roles, including Co-Head of the Global Media Group and Head of Asia-Pacific Investment Banking.  In these positions, Schiffman helped build the M&A business, leading it to win a number of awards, including FinanceAsia's Momentum House of the Year for 2007 and the number one position in completed M&A deals for 2008.  Over his career, he was credited with executing deals well in excess of $100 billion and played a key role in managing the sale of Lehman’s Asian Business to Nomura in September 2008.  Schiffman was subsequently appointed Head of Investment Banking Asia-Pacific, prior to being elevated to Head of Investment Banking for the Americas and CEO of Nomura Securities North America in 2010.  From 2011-2013, Schiffman served as Partner at The Raine Group before becoming Senior Managing Director at Guggenheim Securities from 2013-2016.

In 2016, Schiffman joined IAC as Executive Vice President and Chief Financial Officer, with IAC CEO Joey Levin citing Schiffman’s “outstanding record of integrity, creativity and operational leadership” as a tremendous asset to the company.

In 2018, The Wall Street Journal cited Schiffman’s capital allocation strategy within IAC as an example of a growing trend among global companies to sell assets “as a way to narrow strategic focus and funnel funds to stronger areas of the business.” A profile of Schiffman in CFO Magazine on May 24, 2018, detailed his approach to investor relations and disciplined financial management with a focus on “compounding capital over the long term,” and in an interview with CFO Thought Leader  in November 2018, Schiffman reflected on his past experiences and how he learned to "separate the urgent from the important." 

In a CFO Insights column with Forbes on January 11, 2019, Schiffman explained the importance of balancing short-term success and long-term growth by working closely with brand executives.  

In June 2019, he published a column in CFO Magazine describing the importance of a detailed, rigorous approach to capital allocation in order to win superior returns. Schiffman explained how IAC allocates capital toward three pursuits: (1) investing in our existing businesses; (2) acquisitions; and (3) share repurchases and dividends. 

In June 2021, Jefferies Analyst Brent Thill published a report following IAC's announcement of Glenn's departure as CFO, which noted that IAC stock had outperformed during his tenure and that this announcement would serve as a near-term headwind for the rapid growth pace the company experienced on his watch.

In July 2021, it was announced that Schiffman would take over as CFO of Fanatics. In this position, he will have financial oversight of the company's expansion as a global digital sports platform through new verticals outside of merchandise. 

Schiffman is on the Board of Directors of Match Group, Angi and Vimeo. He previously served as interim Chief Financial Officer of Angi Inc., from September 2017 until August 2019 and again from December 2020 until June 2021. He is a member of the National Committee on United States-China Relations and a member of the Duke Children’s National Leadership Council. He previously served on the Duke Health Board of Visitors from May 2008 until June 2019 and the Duke School of Medicine Board of Visitors from July 2019 until June 2020.

Awards and honors
In 2009, the Atlas Awards named Schiffman, then Senior Managing Director and Head of Asia Pacific Investment Banking at Nomura, the Asia M&A Banker of the Year.

In November 2017, Schiffman was named Institutional Investor’s CFO of the Year for the Midcap Internet Sector.  In November 2019, he was named as one of Institutional Investor's Best CFOs on the Sell-Side for the Internet Sector.

Schiffman was named Institutional Investor’s CFO of the Year 2021 for the Sell-Side.

Philanthropy
In 2014, Schiffman and his wife, Stacy Schiffman, pledged $1 million to create a pediatric cancer research fund at Duke Children’s Hospital & Health Center. In 2019, a further million-dollar donation by the Schiffmans helped provide bridge funding for Duke Children’s research on alveolar rhabdomyosarcoma (RMS), which was subsequently awarded a National Cancer Institute Moonshot grant. Schiffman is Founder and Chairman of the Valerie Fund Endowment and a member of the Valerie Fund’s Board of Advisors.

References 

Living people
Year of birth missing (living people)
American philanthropists
American chief financial officers
Duke University Trinity College of Arts and Sciences alumni